The 2018–19 Montenegrin First League was the 13th season of the top-tier association football in Montenegro. The season began on 3 August 2018 and ended on 25 May 2019. Sutjeska Nikšić were the defending champions.

Teams
Dečić and Kom were relegated at the end of the previous season. After earning promotion from the Montenegrin Second League, Mornar and Lovćen competed in the league this season.
The following 10 clubs competed in 2018–19 First League.

League table

Results
The ten league clubs played each other four times for a total of 36 matches each.

First half of season

Second half of season

Relegation play-offs
The 10th-placed team (against the 3rd-placed team of the Second League) and the 11th-placed team (against the runners-up of the Second League) will both compete in two-legged relegation play-offs after the end of the season.

Summary

Matches

Rudar won 4–1 on aggregate.

Kom won 2–0 on aggregate.

Top scorers

See also 
 Montenegrin First League

References

External links 
 UEFA

Montenegrin First League seasons
Monte
1